Skot may refer to:

 Skot (unit), a deprecated non-SI unit of luminance

SKOT may refer to:

 Otú Airport (ICAO airport code)
 OT-64 SKOT, a Polish-Czechoslovakian APC